Bharatiya Janata Party, Himachal Pradesh, or simply, BJP HP is the affiliate of Bharatiya Janata Party for the state of Himachal Pradesh. Its head office is situated at the Deep Kamal Chakkar, Shimla.

Electoral history

Legislative Assembly election

Lok Sabha election

Leadership

Chief Minister

President

See also
 Bharatiya Janata Party, Gujarat
 Bharatiya Janata Party, Uttar Pradesh
 Bharatiya Janata Party, Madhya Pradesh
 State units of the Bharatiya Janata Party

References 

Political parties in Himachal Pradesh
Himachal Pradesh